Akihiro Sato may refer to:

, Japanese footballer
, Japanese footballer
Akihiro Sato (model), Brazilian model